Nancy Gail Love is an American engineer who is the JoAnn Silverstein Distinguished University Professor of Environmental Engineering at the University of Michigan. She is the former President of the Association of Environmental Engineering and Science Professors and a Fellow of the International Water Association and the Water Environment Federation. In 2021 she was awarded the AEESP Frederick George Pohland Medal.

Early life and education 
Love was an undergraduate student in civil engineering at the University of Illinois Urbana-Champaign. She completed her bachelor's and master's degrees in Chicago before moving to Clemson University as a doctoral researcher in environmental engineering.

Research and career 
Love is an environmental engineer who makes use of chemistry and biology to identify and eliminate contaminants in water. She was the first to study microbial stress in biological treatment systems. She joined the University of Michigan in 2008, where she founded the Environmental Biotechnology Laboratory.

During the Flint water crisis, Love set up Train-the-Trainers, a curriculum which trained residents of Flint to fit faucet-mounted water filters. She has worked with the Flint Technical Advisory Committee on Water. She has worked on the development of decentralized water systems for low income countries. As part of this effort, Love trained students in Addis Ababa in how to design effective decentralized infrastructure.

Love is a past president of the Association of Environmental Engineering and Science Professors.

Awards and honors 
 Fellow of the Association of Environmental Engineering and Science Professors, International Water Association and the Water Environment Federation.
 1993 AAUW Fellow
 1995 National Science Foundation CAREER Award
 2001 Water Research Foundation Paul L. Busch Award
 2008 Water Environment Federation Rudolfs Industrial Waste Management Medal
 2011 Water Environment Federation Gordon Maskew Fair Distinguished Engineering Educator
 2015 Association of Environmental Engineering and Science Professors Distinguished Lecturer
 2019 Association of Environmental Engineering and Science Professors Kappe Lecturer
 2020 Association of Environmental Engineering and Science Professors Science Award
 2020 CEEAA Distinguished Alumni Award
 2021 Association of Environmental Engineering and Science Professors Frederick George Pohland Medal

Selected publications

Journal articles

References 

Living people
University of Michigan faculty
Association of Environmental Engineering and Science Professors
Grainger College of Engineering alumni
Clemson University alumni
Environmental engineers
Year of birth missing (living people)